Ophichthus bicolor, the bicolored snake eel,  is an eel in the family Ophichthidae (worm/snake eels),  found around Taiwan.

References

bicolor
Taxa named by John E. McCosker
Taxa named by Hans Hsuan-Ching Ho
Fish described in 2015